The 2014 United States House of Representatives elections in Mississippi were held on Tuesday, November 4, 2014 to elect the four members of the United States House of Representatives from the state of Mississippi, one from each of the state's four congressional districts. The elections coincided with other elections to the United States Senate and House of Representatives and various state and local elections, including a Senate election in Mississippi.

Overview

District
Results of the 2014 United States House of Representatives elections in Mississippi by district:

District 1

The incumbent was Republican Alan Nunnelee, who had represented the district since 2011. He was re-elected with 60% of the vote in 2012 and the district has a PVI of R+16.

Nunnelee was the only Congressman in Mississippi who did not face a primary opponent in 2014. Democrats Ron Dickey and Rex Weathers, who was a candidate for the seat in 1992 and 1996 and the nominee for the seat in 1998 and 2002, ran.  Nunnelee died on February 6, 2015, shortly after starting his third term in office.

Danny Bedwell, Chairman of the Mississippi Libertarian Party, was the Libertarian nominee.

Primary results

General results

District 2

The incumbent was Democrat Bennie Thompson, who had represented the district since 1993. He was re-elected with 67% of the vote in 2012 and the district had a PVI of D+13.

Damien Fairconetue was running against Thompson in the Democratic primary. No Republican filed to run for the seat.

Primary results

General results

District 3

The incumbent was Republican Gregg Harper, who had represented the district since 2009. He was re-elected with 80% of the vote in 2012 and the district had a PVI of R+14.

Hardy Caraway, an Independent candidate for the 2nd district in 1984 and the Republican nominee for the 2nd district in 2000 was running against Harper in the Republican primary. Democrats Jim Liljeberg; Doug Magee, who was a Republican candidate for the 4th district in 1988; and Dennis Quinn also ran.

Primary results

Primary runoff results

General results

District 4

The incumbent was Republican Steven Palazzo, who had represented the district since 2011. He was re-elected with 64% of the vote in 2012 and the district had a PVI of R+21.

Palazzo was first elected in 2010, defeating Democratic incumbent Gene Taylor. He was targeted by the Club for Growth.

Chris McDaniel, a Republican member of the Mississippi State Senate, considered challenging Palazzo in the primary, but chose instead to run for the United States Senate. Taylor, who served in the U.S. House from 1989 to 2011, has switched parties, and ran for the seat as a Republican.
Tavish Kelly,  Tom Carter, and Ron Vincent, who was a candidate for the seat in 2012, also ran against Palazzo.

Democrats Trish Causey and Matthew Moore, who was the nominee for the seat in 2012, also ran.

Primary results

General results

References

External links
U.S. House elections in Mississippi, 2014 at Ballotpedia
Campaign contributions at OpenSecrets

United States House
2014
Mississippi